Bjorn Vassallo (born 20 January 1980) is a European football administrator and currently President of the Malta Football Association.

Career 
He started his career in as Secretary General at San Ġwann F.C. and later became member of the council of the Malta Football Association. In 2010 Vassallo was engaged as chief executive officer of the MFA. In 2014, he was appointed Secretary General of the Malta Football Association. The position of chief executive officer of the Malta Football Association was then abolished. He also held various positions in UEFA committees, and acted as a UEFA Delegate in Nice for Euro 2016.

In December 2017 he joined FIFA under newly elected president Gianni Infantino. Vassallo was appointed as Director for Europe for FIFA in 2016 and worked under Zvonimir Boban and alongside Marco van Basten. 

He then contested for the Malta FA presidential post in 2019 which he won and was given a 4 year mandate as MFA president. Vassallo is considered as very close to both FIFA and UEFA presidents.

Notes 

1980 births
Living people